William Henry Miller Jr. (born May 3, 1948) is a maritime author and historian who has written numerous books dealing with the golden age of ocean liners.

Miller was born in Hoboken, New Jersey, on May 3, 1948. In addition to his teaching career and writing over 40 books and many articles on the great liners, he was chairman of the World Ship Society's Port of New York Branch from 1970 to 1976. He was deputy director of the New York Harbor Festival Foundation from 1979 to 1982.

He was historian at the Museum of the American Merchant Marine in 1979 and creator of a course entitled "The Ocean Liner" at the New School of Social Research in Manhattan in 1981. He also created the passenger ship database for the Ellis Island Museum. He appeared in the documentary SS United States: Lady in Waiting. A documentary about his life and studies, Mr. Ocean Liner, premiered aboard RMS Queen Mary 2 on July 1, 2010.

In 2020, during the Coronavirus cruising pause, Miller started to participate in online Youtube and Zoom interviews, discussing cruising.

Bibliography

References

1948 births
Living people
21st-century American historians
21st-century American male writers
Writers from Hoboken, New Jersey
Historians from New Jersey
American male non-fiction writers